Wavering Monarch (February 22, 1979 - June 17, 2004) was an American Thoroughbred racehorse and the winner of the 1983 San Fernando Stakes.

Career

Trained by Rusty Arnold, Wavering Monarch's first race was on February 22, 1979 at Keeneland where he came in 1st. He won his next race on April 14, 1982, which was also at Keeneland.

Wavering Monarch competed in the 1982 Kentucky Derby, coming in 12th. He went on to win the Omaha Gold Cup at Ak-Sar-Ben on July 3, 1982 then followed it up with a win in the Haskell Invitational Stakes on July 31.

Wavering Monarch would not see victory again until January 3, 1983 when he won the 1983 San Fernando Stakes for new trainer Laz Barrera. He finished his career soon after with a third-place finish in the Santa Anita Handicap on March 6, 1983.

Wavering Monarch died on June 17, 2004 due to issues stemming from old age.

Stud career
Wavering Monarch's descendants include:

c = colt, f = filly

Pedigree

References

1979 racehorse births
Thoroughbred family 8-h